Roy is a city in Weber County, Utah, United States, located on the west side of Interstate 15. The population estimate in 2019 was 39,613, an increase of 5.8% from 36,884 at the 2010 Census. It is part of the Ogden−Clearfield, Utah Metropolitan Statistical Area, and is considered a suburb of nearby Ogden, although some small businesses are present in Roy.

History
Previously Eastern Shoshone and Goshute land, Roy was settled in 1873 by William Evans Baker, twenty-five years after Ogden. Most of the communities to the east and south had been settled prior to that time. Previously known as Central City, Sandridge, the Basin, and Lakeview—Roy was ultimately named for a local school teacher's child, Roy C. Peebles, who had died. On May 24, 1894, a post office was established and Roy's name was made official. The City of Roy was incorporated on March 10, 1937. Joseph William Jensen was the first mayor of Roy for 6 years, as elected by the commissioners.

Businesses in Roy were limited until the early 1940s. A gas station, several grocery stores, a cafe, and a lumber yard made up the modest business district. However, Roy developed rapidly during World War II. Roy housed many of the workers and personnel from adjacent military installations, including Hill Air Force Base, the Navy Supply Depot (now the Freeport Center), and the Defense Supply Depot. September 1953 marked a milestone in Roy's history—Roy received a charter to establish the first branch bank in the state of Utah. This branch of the Bank of Utah pioneered the way for other banks to establish branches throughout the state. Norton Parker, son of Mayor Dean Parker, was the first manager of this new branch bank.

Roy's population growth was extreme in the 1950s and 1960s when most of the eastern bench was populated with entry-level homes. Starting in the 1980s, construction efforts shifted to the bottom of the hill on the west side of Roy, continuing until about 2005 when new real estate shifted west and south.

Transportation
The city is served by Interstate 15 via exit 338, leading to Utah State Route 97 (5600 South), one of Roy's major roads. The northern entrance of Hill Air Force Base is accessible from this exit, making Roy a common destination for those in the military.

FrontRunner has a station in Roy that opened on April 26, 2008, along with the rest of the northern segment. Two sets of train tracks bisect the city at 2700 West, being served by FrontRunner and Union Pacific Railroad.

Activities 
Roy offers many activities and facilities for public use.

Parks 

 Roy West Park
 Emma Russell Park
 George E. Wahlen Park
 Municipal Park (adjoined with Municipal Elementary)
 Sand Ridge Park
 Foxglen Park
 McCall Park
 Frank Tremea (Roy) Park
 Roger Phil Burnett Meadow Creek Pond
 Memorial Park

Recreation 
The Roy City Recreation Complex is located on Roy High's campus. It includes a swimming pool, basketball courts, a weight room, racquetball courts, and an indoor track. The Roy Aquatic Center is an outdoor swimming complex with a diving pool, children's pool and two slides.

Roy Days 
Roy Days is celebrated on the first week of August. Throughout the week, the Roy West Park is used as a hub for carnival activities and concessions, with events including a car show and golf tournament, culminating on the Saturday with a 5K run, parade, and fireworks show.

Education
Roy is entirely encompassed by Weber School District. There are six elementary schools, two junior highs and one high school.

Lakeview Elementary, Municipal Elementary, and Roy Elementary are located on the south side of Roy, and students are bound to Roy Junior High. Students of North Park Elementary, Valley View Elementary, and Midland Elementary attend Sand Ridge Junior High, although about one-quarter of Midland's populace is zoned to Roy Junior. All students plus those from West Haven Elementary attend Roy High School, a Region 6A high school

Schools

Geography
To the west is the city of Hooper, to the north is West Haven, to the east are Riverdale and Ogden, and the Davis County cities of Clinton and Sunset border Roy on its south.

Climate 
Roy is located in the Wasatch Front, an area that experiences variant seasonal temperatures and generally dry conditions. April or May is generally the wettest month, with July the driest.

Under the Köppen climate classification, Roy has a Mediterranean climate (Csa) or dry-summer continental climate (Dsa) depending on which variant of the system is used.

Demographics

As of the census of 2010, there were 36,884 people, 10,689 households, and 8,604 families residing in the city. The population density was 4,853 people per square mile (1,872/km2). There were 11,053 housing units at an average density of 1,455.3 per square mile (561.5/km2). The racial makeup of the city was 90.75% White, 1.16% African American, 0.59% Native American, 1.79% Asian, 0.11% Pacific Islander, 3.64% from other races, and 1.96% from two or more races. Hispanic or Latino of any race were 7.68% of the population.

There were 10,689 households, out of which 46.5% had children under the age of 18 living with them, 65.8% were married couples living together, 10.3% had a female householder with no husband present, and 19.5% were non-families. 15.8% of all households were made up of individuals, and 5.8% had someone living alone who was 65 years of age or older. The average household size was 3.06 and the average family size was 3.43.

In the city, the population was spread out, with 33.5% under the age of 18, 11.6% from 18 to 24, 30.6% from 25 to 44, 16.1% from 45 to 64, and 8.3% who were 65 years of age or older. The median age was 28 years. For every 100 females, there were 97.9 males. For every 100 females age 18 and over, there were 94.7 males.

The median income for a household in the city was $49,611, and the median income for a family was $53,763. Males had a median income of $37,286 versus $23,793 for females. The per capita income for the city was $17,794. About 4.2% of families and 5.5% of the population were below the poverty line, including 7.5% of those under age 18 and 1.9% of those age 65 or over.

Notable people
 Gina Barberi, famous Radio DJ and co-host of Salt Lake City, Utah's KXRK 96.3FM "Radio from Hell" show. 
 Cynthia Brimhall, Playboy Playmate and actress graduated from Roy High School in 1982. 
 Sabra Johnson, So You Think You Can Dance season 3 winner resided in Roy before moving to New York, New York to pursue her dancing career.
 Jim McMahon, the quarterback who led the Chicago Bears to victory in Super Bowl XX over the New England Patriots.
 Randal Quarles, former Under Secretary of the Treasury and Executive Director of the International Monetary Fund. 
 Bill Schuffenhauer, a three time Olympian and silver medalist in the bobsleigh with the United States Olympics team.
 L'Wren Scott, a fashion designer and partner of Mick Jagger.

See also

 List of cities and towns in Utah

References

External links

 
 Utah History Encyclopedia: Roy

 
Cities in Utah
Cities in Weber County, Utah
Wasatch Front
Ogden–Clearfield metropolitan area
Populated places established in 1873